Cumbia  is a musical genre and folk dance from Panama.

The cultural importance of cumbia has been recognized by UNESCO in its inclusion of it on the Representative List of the Intangible Cultural Heritage of Humanity in 2018. The inscription describes cumbia as "the festive and ritual expressions of the Congo culture [Afro-Panamanian culture] of Panama".

Etymology

Panamanian musician Narciso Garay, in his book "Tradiciones y Cantares de Panamá", published in 1930, assumed that the word cumbia shares the same linguistic root of the word cumbé, dance of African origin registered in the dictionary of the Spanish language as dance of black people

Colombian folklorist Delia Zapata Olivella in her publication of 1962,  ('Cumbia: Musical Synthesis of the Colombian Nation, Historical and Choreographic Review') notes that the only word similar to cumbia present in the dictionary of the Real Academia de la Lengua Española, is  "a dance of African origin and the musical interpretation of this dance." And that  (without acute accent) is used for black people living in Bata, in Spanish continental Guinea (now Equatorial Guinea).

The Colombian cultural researcher Jorge Villarreal Diazgranados in his article "La cumbia, el jolgorio y sobre todo el placer" (La cumbia, fun and above all pleasure), published in 1977 states:

An English translation of the quote above would be:

Musicologist and folk-researcher Guillermo Abadía Morales, in his 1977 "Compendio general de folclore colombiano" (General Compendium of Colombian folklore), says that cumbia is a shortened form of cumbancha, a word whose root is Kumba, Mandinka demonym, and adds that the Republic of the Congo was called Cumba.

Cuban ethnologist Graciano states that the words Kumba, Kumbe and Koumbi, replacing the letter "k" for "c" (when turned into Spanish) means "drums" or "dances". He adds that cumbé, cumbia and cumba were drums of African origin in the Antilles. On the other hand, he states that cumba - kumba, African word for Bantu or Congo tribes, means "roar", "shock", "shouting", "scandal", "joy". The Panamanian folklorist Manuel Zarate adds to this theory in his "Tambor y Socavón" (Drum and Tunnel), as the root of the word cumbia. Also, for Ortiz, among congos, nkumbi is a drum.

In 2006, Colombian musician and musicologist Guillermo Carbo Ronderos said that the etymology of the word cumbia is "still controversial" and that it "seems to derive from the Bantu word ''cumbé"

Origins

Chronicles and theories 

In Panama it is generally accepted that the cumbia is of African descent. The dance is mentioned in many historical references, travel diaries, and newspapers of Panama during the 19th century.

The oldest news that exists in Panama of the cumbia dates from the early 19th century, from the family of Don Ramón Vallarino Obarrio, where slaves dance cumbia in his living room.

This story was passed from generation to generation since Doña Rita Vallarino Obarrio to Doña Matilde Obarrio, who published it in his "Sketch of Panama Colonial Life" in the early 20th century the XX.

the passage reads:

A large dance, similar to the modern cumbia, was described by travelers visiting Panama during the nineteenth century. Theodore Johnson described such a dance accompanied by singing, drums and a guitar when he stayed overnight at Gorgona in 1849.

the passage reads:

Near to close of the century Ernesto Restrepo specifically mentioned the cumbia as a dance in the Darien.

the passage reads:

Tradition 

Simple in design but full of energy and life, the cumbia is the folk dance which best captures the spontaneous, fun-loving mood of fiesta time in Panama. The simple, repetitive melodies and accented drumbeats create a general feeling of happiness and gaiety which is reflected in the spirit of the dancers. the tempo is rapid as couples move quickly around the large circle, making individual turns and exchanges as directed by subtle changes in the music.

Music and instrumentation

Music of the cumbia is easily recognized by its binary rhythm and short phrases which never descend and finalize, but seem to repeat continuously. As a musical form the cumbia is well-known today because the melodies and rhythm have been adapted to the modern and very popular pindín. In earlier times as violin, guitar, tambor, caja, triangle and maraca or churuca accompanied the cumbia. Today the accordion replaces the stringed instruments in most musical groups.

Dance

The way of dancing the cumbia varies between the different provinces of Panama.

Cumbia santeña

Dancers form a double circle with the men occupying the inner circle and the women the outer circle. Couple circle counter-clockwise and change their steps according to subtle variations in the melody. During figure one, "el paseo", couples stand side by side and circle with a rapid two-step. In figure two, la seguidilla, dancers face their partners and continue circling with small side-ward steps. When the music indicates figure three, partners turn individually and walk around each other as in square dance do-si-do. Once more the partners turn individually and then continue circling with the  step of figure two. The entire sequence repeats several times.

Cumbia atravesá

This type of cumbia receives its name from the unusually restless quality of the accompaniment. The tempo is notably faster. While the accompanying instruments play a lively six-eight rhythm, the flexible nature of this meter enables the accent to vary between a two-four and a three-four rhythm. The choreography follows the common cumbia except of the addition of footstamps, before the last .

Cumbia chorrerana

More calmly, but with obvious enjoyment, the women circle the dance floor carrying lighted candles in their right hands. The men move to the outer circle as the women return to the outer circle and the men move to the center. Partners repeat this graceful interchange one more time before returning to the  figure. Without pause one figure dissolves into the next, and the flames of the lighted candles create a luminous weaving pattern on the darkened stage.

See also
 Baila
Latin Grammy Award for Best Cumbia/Vallenato Album
Tamborito
 Tropical music

Notes

References

External links
A Musical Journey Through Cumbia
In a Nutshell: Cumbia Guide to cumbia (English)

 
Panamanian music
Latin American folk dances
Native American dances
Tropical music
Music of the African diaspora